The Lakshmibai National Institute of Physical Education (LNIPE), formerly Lakshmibai National University of Physical Education, is a higher education institute deemed-to-be-university, located in Gwalior, Madhya Pradesh, India. Under the aegis of Ministry of Youth Affairs and Sports and committed for excellence in physical education, coaching and sports in the country. The campus is on the Agra–Mumbai Highway, at a walking distance of around 500m from Gwalior railway station, Shaktinagar, Gwalior.

History 

Lakshmibai National University of Physical Education began its life in 1957, in the form of Lakshmibai College of Physical Education (LCPE), in memory of Rani Lakshmibai of Jhansi, as a college of physical education, affiliated to Vikram University. In 1964, the college was shifted to Jiwaji University.

In 1973, the college was renamed to Lakshmibai National College of Physical Education (LNCPE) and nine years later, in 1982, was upgraded as an autonomous college. A further name change occurred in 1995, to Lakshmibai National Institute of Physical Education. In 2000, the name Lakshmibai National University of Physical Education was accepted when it was declared, by the Government of India, as a deemed university, handing over the affairs to the Ministry of Youth Affairs and Sports, which is funding all its activities. In 2017, it was renamed as Lakshmibai National Institute of Physical Education after a UGC order to not use the word "University" in deemed universities' names.

Campus
LNIPE is in Shaktinagar, Gwalior, Madhya Pradesh, on the Agra - Mumbai Highway, on land measuring 153 acres, which houses a faculty block, auditorium, research block, laboratories and administration building.

Organisation and administration
The institute operates through the following departments:
 Department of Physical Education Pedagogy
 Department of Exercise Physiology
 Department of Sports Psychology
 Department of Sports Biomechanics
 Department of Health Sciences and Fitness
 Centre for Sports Coaching and Management
 Centre for Advanced Studies

It also established three subsidiary centres: the Academic Staff College, the North East Regional Centre and the PYKKA Resource Centre.

Accreditation
Like all universities in India, LNIPE is approved by the University Grants Commission (UGC).  It is also accredited by National Assessment and Accreditation Council (NAAC).

Publications
LNIPE publishes the Indian Journal of Physical Education, Sports Medicine and Exercise Science, an online magazine called LNUPE@Glance and two monthly newsletters, Reflections and LNUPE Talk.

See also 

 Sport in India

References

External links
 

Sports universities and colleges
Sport schools in India
Physical education in India
Deemed universities in India
Universities and colleges in Gwalior
Physical Education and Sports universities in India
Educational institutions established in 1957
1957 establishments in Madhya Pradesh